Shelflife Records is a Portland and San Francisco based independent record label run by Ed Mazzucco and Matthew Bice and has produced such bands as Days, Acid House Kings, and The Radio Dept.

History 
Shelflife Records traces its 1995 origins to a bedroom in a southern California suburb, where it began in conjunction with a mail order and distribution service. A fan of 1980s English pop and inspired by labels such as Factory and Sarah Records, Ed Mazzucco launched the label as a way to expose foreign indie pop groups to US audiences.  Shelflife's first release was the August 1996 compilation Whirl-Wheels which included tracks by  Club 8, Boyracer, La Buena Vida, and Ed's own band The Autocollants.

In 1997 Ed moved Shelflife to New York City where he began long-time collaborations with graphic designer Jill Bliss and producer Jon Chaikin. The mail order and distribution service were discontinued in order to devote more time to the growing roster of artists, a move that quickly propelled the label out of its hobby status. During the late 1990s Shelflife steadily gained recognition as twee pop and indie music became increasingly popular. From 1998 until 2001 the label hosted The September Set, an annual showcase of live pop music from bands on Shelflife and other labels.

In June 2007 Ed and Matthew Bice relaunched the label with a new focus on blending art with music. Their newsletter explained, "Each release will feature exclusive tracks in a limited edition, collectable package designed by various up-and-coming artists."

Roster
Current

 Airiel
 Brideshead
 California Snow Story
 Corasandel
 Close Lobsters
 Dylan Mondegreen
 Even As We Speak
 The Fireworks
 The Garlands
 Goodly Thousands
 The Holiday Crowd
 Ice Choir
 Jim Ruiz Set
 The Keep Left Signs
 Life On Venus
 Lost Tapes
 The Luxembourg Signal
 Nah...
 The Ocean Blue
 Outerhope
 Palms On Fire
 Pia Fraus
 Pinkshinyultrablast
 Picnic
 Pretty Sad
 The Proctors
 Red Sleeping Beauty
 She Sir
 Some Gorgeous Accident
 Star Tropics
 Tears Run Rings
 The Treasures Of Mexico
 vhs dream
 Laura Watling
 When Nalda Became Punk

Former

Acid House Kings
The Arrogants
Artisokka
A Smile and a Ribbon
The Autocollants
Balloon Magic
Brittle Stars
Burning Hearts
Call and Response
The Castaway Stones
Champagne Riot
Charming
Churchbuilder
Club 8
The Consultants
Days
Evening Lights
The Fairways
Free Loan Investments
The Frenchmen
Gingerlys
 Horse Shoes
 Kawaii
 Kuryakin
 Language of Flowers
 Le Coupe
 Majestic
 Majestic 12
 The Maybellines
 Moving Pictures
 Phoebe Quest
 Postal Blue
 The Radio Dept.
 River
 The Ruling Class
 The Shermans
 Soda Shop
 Souvenir
 Sushi
 Thieves Like Us
 Warm Morning

See also
 Yo Gabba Gabba! - A children's television series co-created by Scott Schultz of the band Majestic.

External links
Official Website

American independent record labels
Indie pop record labels
Companies based in Portland, Oregon